Peter Kerr, AM, is an Australian water polo sports official best known for taking the Judge's Oath at the 2000 Summer Olympics in Sydney. He also was an official for the water polo events at the 1996 Summer Olympics in Atlanta, along with being a referee at the 2000 Games in Sydney. Kerr served as section manager of the Australian team for the 1988 Summer Olympics in Seoul.

A lawyer from Sydney, Kerr serves as president of Australian Water Polo, Inc., a position he has held since 1996. In 2008, he was named a Member of the Order of Australia for "service to water polo as a player, referee, coach and administrator, and to the community, particularly through executive positions with a range of sporting and charitable organisations ". In 2011, he was inducted into the Water Polo Australia Hall of Fame.

See also
 Australia men's Olympic water polo team records and statistics

References

External links
 
Australian Water Polo, Inc. announcement of Kerr's AM.
Kemp Strang Lawyers (Sydney, Australia) profile

Lawyers from Sydney
Australian male water polo players
Living people
Members of the Order of Australia
Water polo players from Sydney
Australian water polo officials
Year of birth missing (living people)
Olympic officials
Oath takers at the Olympic Games